Octave Mirbeau is an 1895 plaster relief by Auguste Rodin of the writer Octave Mirbeau, now in the Museo Soumaya. He had got to know him thanks to The Age of Bronze and The Gates of Hell - Mirbeau visited Rodin's studio, published the first description of Gates in the review La France, promoted Rodin's other work and died only a few months before the sculptor.

Rodin showed on several occasions gratitude towards the writer who played the important role of promoter of his work.

Death
Mirbeau died on 16 February 1917, a few months before Auguste Rodin.

See also
List of sculptures by Auguste Rodin

References

External links

Sculptures by Auguste Rodin
1895 sculptures
Sculptures of the Museo Soumaya
Plaster sculptures
Sculptures of the Musée Rodin
Octave Mirbeau